The regional parks of Italy are protected natural areas consisting of terrestrial, river, lake areas and stretches of sea overlooking the coast, of environmental and naturalistic value, which represent, within one or more adjacent regions, a homogeneous system, identified by the naturalistic assets of the locations, with landscape and artistic values ​​and cultural traditions of local populations.

They are officially regulated by Presidential Decree D.P.R. 616/77, which transferred the responsibility for their upkeep to the Italian regions. The fifth edition (2003) of Italy's Official List of Protected Natural Areas (EUAP) comprises 105 officially designated regional parks, covering a total land area of some 12,000 square kilometres. The list which follows also includes a number of parks not mentioned in the EUAP.

Northwest Italy

Valle d'Aosta

Piedmont

Lombardy

Liguria

Northeast Italy

Trentino-Alto Adige/Südtirol

Veneto

Friuli-Venezia Giulia

Emilia-Romagna

Central Italy

Tuscany

Marche

Umbria

Lazio

Southern Italy

Abruzzo

Molise

Campania

Apulia

Basilicata

Calabria

Insular Italy

Sicily

Sardinia

See also

Conservation in Italy
List of national parks of Italy
List of Marine Protected Areas of Italy

Notes

External links
 List of regional parks of Italy (official website)

 
Regional parks of Italy, list of
Italy
Regional parks